Lewis Charles Beebe (December 7, 1891 – February 17, 1951) was an American brigadier general. He was one of the survivors of the Bataan Death March. Beebe was Chief of Staff of U.S. Forces under General Jonathan Wainwright during World War II. He had previously been an Assistant Chief of Staff under General Douglas MacArthur.

Beebe was an enlisted soldier from March 1913 until February 1914. He then enlisted in the Oregon National Guard in April 1916 and was commissioned as a second lieutenant of coast artillery in September 1916 after graduating from the University of Oregon. Beebe subsequently accepted a commission as a second lieutenant of infantry in the Regular Army in November 1917. During World War I, he served as a temporary captain with the 30th Infantry Regiment, 3rd Division in France, earning the Distinguished Service Cross and a Purple Heart.

Beebe graduated from the Command and General Staff School in 1932 and the Army War College in 1939. He was promoted to major in August 1935 and lieutenant colonel in July 1940.

Sent to the Philippines, Beebe received temporary promotions to colonel in December 1941 and brigadier general in March 1942. After surrendering to Japanese forces, he spent over three years as a prisoner of war.

Beebe served in Texas and West Germany after the war. His wartime promotion to brigadier general was made permanent in January 1948. He retired from active duty on September 30, 1950.

Beebe suffered a cerebral hemorrhage and died at his home in Faribault, Minnesota on February 17, 1951. He was buried at Arlington National Cemetery six days later.

See also
 Philippines campaign (1941–1942)

References

External links
A Brief Biography of Brig. Gen. Lewis C. Beebe – Osceola County Iowa Genealogy
Generals of World War II

1891 births
1951 deaths
People from Osceola County, Iowa
Oregon National Guard personnel
University of Oregon alumni
United States Army personnel of World War I
Recipients of the Distinguished Service Cross (United States)
Recipients of the Croix de Guerre 1914–1918 (France)
United States Army Command and General Staff College alumni
United States Army War College alumni
United States Army generals of World War II
American prisoners of war in World War II
World War II prisoners of war held by Japan
Bataan Death March prisoners
Recipients of the Distinguished Service Medal (US Army)
United States Army generals
People from Faribault, Minnesota
Burials at Arlington National Cemetery